The Pleasure Gardens Theatre was a theatre in Folkestone in Kent. It was opened in 1886 in a building that had previously been constructed as an Exhibition Hall in 1851. It was later converted into a cinema before closing in 1964.

In the interwar years several plays premiered there prior to West End runs including Dorothy Brandon's 1923 hit The Outsider. The following year Sutton Vane's Falling Leaves was first staged at Folkestone.

References

Bibliography
 Wearing, J. P. The London Stage 1920-1929: A Calendar of Productions, Performers, and Personnel. Rowman & Littlefield, 2014.

 

Theatres in Kent
Theatres completed in 1886
1886 establishments in England
Folkestone